Banja (or Baja) or Banja Rudnička is a settlement in the Skenderaj municipality in Kosovo. The rural settlement lies on a cadastral area with the same name, of 1033 hectares. 
The village has a Serbian majority; in the 1991 census, it had 274 inhabitants.

Geography
Banja is located circa 2 km from Rudnik, on the Peć–Kosovska Mitrovica road.

History
Banje or Banja Rudnička is an Old Serbian settlement. It is mentioned for the first time in a charter of Serbian King Stefan Uroš I (r. 1243–1276), dating to the mid-13th century, granted (metochion) to the Gračanica monastery. It was then granted by King Stefan Milutin (r. 1282–1321) to the Banjska Monastery. The village church, dedicated to St. Nicholas, as founded by nobleman Rodop who served Serbian Despot Đurađ Branković (r. 1427–1456), and was buried here in 1436. Two bells found in its ruins are preserved in the Patriarchal Monastery of Peć and National Museum in Belgrade. Between 1936–41 the church was renovated, but destroyed during World War II by Albanian fascists. The village was among those in North Kosovo that was burned down by Albanian paramilitaries and the Serb population expelled. In 1971 the church was reconstructed. The church was used as a model for an Orthodox church in Norway.

On the night of 21 May 1998 a large number of Albanian Kosovo Liberation Army members of Drenica attacked the villages of Banja and Suvo Grlo (which are inhabited by Serbs) and a military station in Rudnik, above Skenderaj. Serbs and Serbian police answered the fire, no deaths or injuries were reported by them.

Notes

References

Sources

Villages in Skenderaj
Serbian enclaves in Kosovo
Medieval Serbian sites in Kosovo